Veľká Ida is a village and municipality in Košice-okolie District in the Kosice Region of eastern Slovakia.

History
In historical records the village was first mentioned in 1251, in 1275 it was recorded as Ida.

Geography
The village lies at an altitude of 216 metres and covers an area of 31.007 km². The municipality has a population of 3000 people.

The village has its own birth registry and police force.

External links
https://web.archive.org/web/20080111223415/http://www.statistics.sk/mosmis/eng/run.html 

Villages and municipalities in Košice-okolie District
Romani communities in Slovakia